Sessa Cilento (from Greek Σύεσσα - Syessa) is a town and comune in the province of Salerno in the Campania region of south-western Italy.

Geography
Sessa Cilento is located in Cilento and in its National Park. borders with the municipalities of Lustra, Omignano, Perdifumo, Pollica, San Mauro Cilento, Serramezzana and Stella Cilento.

The municipality counts the frazioni of Casigliano, Castagneta, Felitto Piano, San Mango Cilento, Santa Lucia, Offoli and Valle.

See also
Cilento and Vallo di Diano National Park

References

External links

Cities and towns in Campania
Localities of Cilento